In enzymology, a succinyl-diaminopimelate desuccinylase is an enzyme that catalyzes the chemical reaction

N-succinyl-LL-2,6-diaminoheptanedioate + H2O  succinate + LL-2,6-diaminoheptanedioate

Thus, the two substrates of this enzyme are N-succinyl-LL-2,6-diaminoheptanedioate and H2O, whereas its two products are succinate and LL-2,6-diaminoheptanedioate.

This enzyme belongs to the family of hydrolases, those acting on carbon-nitrogen bonds other than peptide bonds, specifically in linear amides. This enzyme is also called . This enzyme participates in lysine biosynthesis.

References 

 

EC 3.5.1
Enzymes of unknown structure